CBM-Serango Christian Hospital located in Serango, Gajapati District, Odisha, India was the outcome of missions of Canadian Baptist Mission who set foot in 1876 with arrival of The Reverend William F. Armstrong and subsequently established a mission station on the hills in Serango.  It is a participating hospital of Council of Christian Hospitals, an autonomous body founded to take forward medical missions of Canadian Baptist Ministries.

Memberships
CBM Serango Christian Hospital is a member of,
 Council of Christian Hospitals, Pithapuram, Andhra Pradesh,
 Christian Medical Association of India, New Delhi  Hospital also networks with Christian Medical College, Vellore

Clergy Retreats
Serango being a serene location, Canadian Baptist Ministries, founder of the Hospital, holds periodical Clergy retreats for its Priests hailing from Utkal Baptist Churches Association, Soura Baptist Christian Mandali Sammilani, Kui Baptist Association and Convention of Baptist Churches of Northern Circars.  Old Testament Scholar and past India Church Relations Coordinator of Canadian Baptist Ministries, The Rev. G. Babu Rao, CBCNC together with The Rev. Ron Harris, CBM used to lead Clergy retreats for nearly two decades during the period 1995-2012.

References

Further reading
 
 
 
 
 

Christian hospitals
Medical Council of India
Hospitals in Odisha
Medical colleges in Odisha
Gajapati district
Canadian Baptist Ministries

Educational institutions in India with year of establishment missing